Novelita Villanueva Gallegos (born April 16, 1946), better known as Nova Villa or Tita Novs, is a Filipino actress and a veteran comedian. 

With a career spanning more than 50 years, Villa is recognized as the original 'Goddess of Comedy' and one of the defining legends in Philippine television and film industry. She is a recipient of the prestigious "Papal Award" given by Pope Francis for helping share the Catholic faith in the local show business. She has also starred in more than 150 films and is a 4-time 'Best Comedy Actress' winner by PMPC Star Awards for Television. In 2014, Villa received the 'Hall of Fame' award at the 12th Gawad Tanglaw Awards and the highly coveted 'Manuel De Leon Award for Exemplary Achievement Award' at the 37th Luna Awards in 2019 for her contributions to local film and television industry. The same year, she also scored a 'Best Supporting Actress' nomination at the Eddy's Award.

Personal life
Villa's sister is the late Myrna Villanueva, also an actress and comedian better known by her screen name Tiya Pusit.

Filmography

Films

Television

Awards
 1987 PMPC Star Award for Best Comedy Actress-(Chika Chika Chiks), Winner
 1991 PMPC Star Award for Best Comedy Actress-(Abangan Ang Susunod Na Kabanata), Winner
 1998 PMPC Star Award for Best Comedy Actress-(Home Along Da Riles), Winner
 2012 Golden Screen TV Awards for Helen Vela Lifetime Achievement Award for Comedy
 2013 Golden Screen TV Awards for Outstanding Supporting Actress in a Gag or Comedy Program-(Tweets for My Sweets),Nominated
 2014 Golden Screen TV Awards for Outstanding Supporting Actress in a Gag or Comedy Program-(Pepito Manaloto),Winner
 2014 28th Star Awards for Television for Best Comedy Actress-(Pepito Manaloto), Nominated
 2014 28th Star Awards for Television for Ading Fernando Lifetime Achievement Award
 2015 Gawad Urian Awards for Best Actress (Pinakamahusay na Pangunahing Aktres)-(1st ko si 3rd)-Nominated
 2015 Metro Manila Film Festival for Best Supporting Actress (All You Need Is Pag-Ibig)-nominated

References

External links

1947 births
Living people
ABS-CBN personalities
Actresses from Metro Manila
Filipino film actresses
Filipino people of Spanish descent
Filipino Roman Catholics
Filipino television actresses
GMA Network personalities
Ilocano people
People from Pangasinan
People from Quezon City
Filipino women comedians